Aphelia paleana, the timothy tortrix ,  is a moth of the family Tortricidae. It is found in Europe, and across the Palearctic to China (Heilongjiang, Beijing) and the Russian Far East.

The wingspan is 18–22 mm. The head and thorax are pale ferruginous. The forewings are narrowed anteriorly and whitish -ochreous or pale yellow -ochreous, sometimes greyish tinged, the base yellower. The hindwings are grey. The larva is blackish with large white spots; the head and thorax are black with white anterior edges. Julius von Kennel provides a full description. 

The moth flies from June to August in western Europe.

The larvae feed on various herbaceous plants such as Pulicaria dysenterica and wolfberry.

References

External links
 
 waarneming.nl 
 Taxonomy at Fauna Europaea
 Timothy Tortrix at UK Moths

Aphelia (moth)
Moths described in 1793
Moths of Asia
Tortricidae of Europe
Taxa named by Jacob Hübner